Megachile analis is a species of bee in the family Megachilidae. It was described by Nylander in 1852.

References

Analis
Insects described in 1852
Taxa named by William Nylander (botanist)